Rayuan Pulau Kelapa (Solace on Coconut Island) is an Indonesian song written  by Ismail Marzuki (1914-1958), who wrote a number of popular tunes in the country's early post-independence period. The lyrics praise Indonesia's natural beauty, such as its flora, islands and beaches, and profess undying love for the country.

The song is a nostalgic favourite among Indonesian expatriates, particularly those who left the country for the Netherlands in the 1940s and 1950s, after independence.

The 2016 Single "Satu Indonesiaku" includes the song in the medley "Zamrud Khatulistiwa", "Kolam Susu" and "Pemuda"

A recording of the song by Gordon Tobing was popular in the USSR in the 1950s. The song was extremely popular among Russians, was arranged by the Soviet Composer Vitaly Geviksman and performed in Russian by the singer Maya Golovnya (Russian text by V. Korchagin).

In 1956, the song recorded in Polish under the name "Indonezja" by Polish singer Janusz Gniatkowski.

In 1956, the song recorded in Chinese under the name "Ye Dao Gu Niang" by Macanese singer Poon Sow-keng.

In 1958, the song recorded in Finnish under the name "Indonesia" by Estonian opera singer Georg Ots.

In 1980, the song recorded in Dutch under the name "Indonesië, ik hou van jou" by Dutch singer Anneke Grönloh.

In 2005, "Rayuan Pulau Kelapa" song performed again by Indonesian comedic band Project Pop under the name "Indovers".

In 2015, "Rayuan Pulau Kelapa" song performed again by Indonesian rock band Endank Soekamti.

Lyrics

Uses in media 
During the New Order era, TVRI plays the song as its closedown tune every evening. In 2014, the station has been using the song again at closedown (replacing Bagimu Negeri by Kusbini), but currently the song is no longer shown. It is also used on Trans TV, Indosiar, DAAI TV, RTV, Trans7, Bandung TV, Banten TV, Inspira TV, Cahaya TV (2024-coming soon and replacing Bagimu Negeri by Kusbini) and CNN Indonesia.

Portion of the song is played as interval signal on RRI Pro 3 radio network.

Portion of the song in international TV also played and followed by both classical pieces such as William Tell's Storm and Flight of the Bumblebee.

References

External links

Indonesian patriotic songs
Indonesian culture
Indonesian songs